USS LST-519 was an  built for the U.S. Navy in World War II. She was later renamed USS Calhoun County (LST-519) after counties in eleven states in the United States.

LST-519 was built by the Chicago Bridge & Iron Company, Seneca, Illinois. Her keel was laid on 17 September 1943. She was launched on 25 January 1944. Placed in partial commission status at Seneca on 8 February, LST-519 proceeded down the Illinois River into the Mississippi River and down to the Naval base at Algiers, Louisiana, directly across from New Orleans where she was fully commissioned on 17 February 1944. A Coast Guard crew trained the LST's Navy crew on this river cruise from Seneca while the ship was en route to Algiers.

Operational history

World War II
Following shakedown training on the way to Camp Bradford in the Hampton Roads area of Virginia, additional personnel reported aboard for more shakedown training on the Chesapeake Bay. LST-519 departed the United States as part of Convoy UGS-36 for North Africa.

On 1 April 1944, while off Cherchell, Algeria, the convoy was attacked by thirty Ju 88 and Do 214 bombers flying out of Southern France. Although all of the LST-519 guns fired at the enemy, the ship was not credited with downing any of the attacking German aircraft. At Oran, USS LCT-148, a Landing Craft Tank, was secured to the main deck for transport to England. She arrived at Plymouth on 11 May 1944.

LST-519 received two battle stars in World War II, one for Convoy UGS-36 and the other for the D-Day landing at Juno Beach on 6 June 1944. She was employed in shuttling tanks, other vehicles, supplies and troops to France. After delivering tanks, trucks, ambulances, railroad cars, ammunition and other supplies to the beaches of Normandy and Seine River ports and to the other ports of France, LST-519 would return to England with wounded soldiers, damaged equipment or prisoners. Following the collapse of Germany LST-519 was attached to the British 226th Section of the 25th Bomb Disposal Company, Corps of Royal Engineers. Her primary mission in May 1945 was to dispose of condemned ammunition from Kiel and Hamburg in deep water.

LST-519 made fifty-three round trips across the English Channel, second only to one other American LST. After hostilities ceased, LST-519 departed Plymouth, England, on 9 July 1945, arriving Norfolk, Virginia, on 25 July 1945.

Post World War II
On 5 December 1945, the operational command of LST-519 was transferred from the Amphibious Force to the Service Force. Mid-January 1946, found her in Guantanamo Bay, Cuba, for the first postwar Atlantic Fleet maneuvers. On the trip from Norfolk, LST-519 transported on her main deck four LCM landing craft, each of which carried an LCVP inside. LST-519 was one of several LSTs that served as mother-ships to small boat crews who operated LCMs and LCVPs as liberty boats for the fleet anchored in the harbor.

Leaving Cuba in mid-February for Searsport, Maine, on the Penobscot Bay, LST-519 had to put in at Boston's Charlestown Navy Yard to repair storm damage suffered in a gale off Cape Hatteras. She then proceeded to Searsport, for her next assignment. At Searsport, a Liberty ship transloaded over 350 tons of obsolete 1,000- and 500-pound aerial bombs into a newly constructed temporary wooden bin on the main deck. Out past the continental shelf – about one hundred fifty miles offshore with a minimum depth of 1,000 fathoms – these bombs were dumped along with 5,280 bazooka anti-tank rounds. At least four such bomb-dumping missions were made before the LST-519 was relieved by three other LSTs. Davisville, Rhode Island, was the next port of call. A tank deck full of steel pontoon cubes were transported to Norfolk Navy Yard where they were promptly assembled into large pontoon barges as soon as they were unloaded.

On 15 July 1946, the LST-519 was transferred to the Commander, Eastern Sea Frontier for duty as a disposal vessel of defective and obsolete munitions. To facilitate dumping of ordnance, toxic and nuclear waste at sea, special equipment and bins were installed. After this, LST-519 operated off the Atlantic and Gulf coasts, disposing of ammunition from Naval ammunition depots at Indianhead, MD; Hingham, MA; Yorktown, VA; Charleston, SC; Earle, NJ; Fort Mifflin, PA; New Orleans, LA and Newport, RI.

In accordance with a Secretary of the Navy directive dated 12 May 1955, LST-519 was renamed USS Calhoun County (LST-519) effective 1 July 1955. She was the first ship to bear the name, which honors a Calhoun County located in each of eleven states – Alabama, Arkansas, Florida, Georgia, Illinois, Iowa, Michigan, Mississippi, South Carolina, Texas and West Virginia.

On the morning of 20 June 1956, while dumping condemned ammunition from NAD Charleston, the Calhoun County experienced underwater explosions, caused by the detonation of several torpex-loaded torpedo warheads. Minor hull damage resulted, but there were no personnel casualties. Repairs were made at Savannah, GA. From 24 August to 23 October 1956, Calhoun County underwent its regular shipyard overhaul at the Bethlehem Steel Shipyard, Staten Island, NY. Major improvements effected during this period were the installation of a new radar and the renewal of most of the ammunition bin on the main deck. Following her overhaul, Calhoun County reported to Guantanamo Bay, Cuba, for refresher training from 6 to 24 November 1956. She received an overall mark of "Good" on her battle problem.

Calhoun County was struck by SS Nellie on 27 June 1959 in the vicinity of Sandy Hook, New Jersey. As the result, the 40 mm gun tub on the port side had to be removed and the degaussing system was placed out of commission. There were no personnel casualties. During April 1960, Calhoun County operated with TG 7.3 on a scientific mission in the vicinity of Roosevelt Roads Naval Station, Puerto Rico. A shipyard overhaul was completed in September 1960, after which she participated in underway training off the coast of Virginia. In October, she was deployed to Naval Station Argentia, Newfoundland, for ammunition disposal. After four disposal trips, this command undertook an amphibious disembarking of an experimental team off the beach of LaPoille, Newfoundland. This was followed by a five-day "good will" trip to Halifax, Nova Scotia.

November 1960, through June 1961, the Calhoun County was engaged in routine dumping operations from Boston to Charleston. She was decommissioned 1 November 1962 after eighteen-and-a-half years of Naval service. Only one other LST of World War II class was in continuous commission longer than the LST-519. Her final duty was as a gunnery target for several warships. However, gunfire failed to sink her, so demolition charges were used to carry out the coup de grâce.

Controversy
A 2013 article in the Tampa Bay Times reported allegations that for 15 years after the close of World War II, Calhoun County was involved in a covert operation to dispose of radioactive toxic waste into ocean. The operation allegedly lead to deaths of sailors serving aboard during this period from illnesses linked to radiation, and the ship ultimately had to be disposed of by sinking do to radioactivity. The US Navy has denied the allegations.

References 

 
 Tampa Bay Times – Atomic Sailors

External links
 

Calhoun County, West Virginia
LST-491-class tank landing ships
World War II amphibious warfare vessels of the United States
Ships built in Seneca, Illinois
1944 ships